Penelope Hunt (born 18 January 1948) is a New Zealand sprinter. She competed in the women's 400 metres at the 1972 Summer Olympics.

References

1948 births
Living people
Athletes (track and field) at the 1970 British Commonwealth Games
Athletes (track and field) at the 1972 Summer Olympics
Athletes (track and field) at the 1974 British Commonwealth Games
Athletes (track and field) at the 1978 Commonwealth Games
New Zealand female sprinters
Olympic athletes of New Zealand
Sportspeople from Timaru
Commonwealth Games competitors for New Zealand
Olympic female sprinters